Neil Diamond's Greatest Hits is the first compilation album of songs recorded by Neil Diamond. It was released in 1968 by Bang Records after Diamond left Bang for Uni Records. Bang would eventually release four Neil Diamond compilation albums on top of the two original Diamond albums that Bang issued in 1966 and '67. Ten of the twelve songs on this album are original Diamond compositions with the remaining two cover versions of oldies.

After Columbia Records absorbed Bang Records, this album was replaced by a new compilation titled Classics: The Early Years which replaced the cover songs with additional Diamond originals: "I'm a Believer" (which became a hit for The Monkees) and "Shilo" which Bang initially rejected as a single but was later released as a single and became a hit in 1970 after this album was released.

Track listing
All songs composed by Neil Diamond unless otherwise indicated.

References

Neil Diamond compilation albums
1968 compilation albums
Bang Records compilation albums
Albums produced by Ellie Greenwich
Albums produced by Jeff Barry